An O visa is a classification of non-immigrant temporary worker visa granted by the United States to an alien "who possesses extraordinary ability in the sciences, arts, education, business, or athletics, or who has a demonstrated record of extraordinary achievement in the motion picture or television industry and has been recognized nationally or internationally for those achievements", and to certain assistants and immediate family members of such aliens.

According to United States Citizenship and Immigration Services, there are three types of O visas:

 O-1A: individuals with an extraordinary ability in the sciences, education, business, or athletics (not including the arts, motion pictures or television industry)
 O-1B: individuals with an extraordinary ability in the arts or extraordinary achievement in motion picture or television industry.
 O-2: individuals who will accompany an O-1, artist or athlete, to assist in a specific event or performance. "For an O-1A, the O-2's assistance must be an 'integral part' of the O-1A's activity. For an O-1B, the O-2's assistance must be 'essential' to the completion of the O-1B's production. The O-2 worker has critical skills and experience with the O-1 that cannot be readily performed by a U.S. worker and which are essential to the successful performance of the O-1."
 O-3: individuals who are the spouse or children of O-1s and O-2s.

An O-1 visa is initially granted for up to three years. Subsequently, it can be extended for one year at a time. There is no limit to the number of extensions that may be granted. The term "O-1" refers to (O)(i), added by section 207(a) of the Immigration Act of 1990, which provides for the admission of "aliens of extraordinary ability" in the stated fields. Spouses and dependent children of O-1 visa holders do not receive the status, but instead qualify for O-3 visas.

The O-1 visa legislation was drafted in 1990 by former congressman Bruce Morrison of Connecticut.

Requirements
The O-1 visa application must be submitted along with a petition submitted by a US Petitioner. This includes information regarding the petitioner and evidence documenting the alien's extraordinary ability, details of the proposed work in the U.S. in the form of an itinerary, supporting contracts that collate with the itinerary, and evidence of past work that confirms alien's extraordinary status is true and valid. It also must include an advisory letter from a US established person in the alien's appropriate industry field. This person is generally required to possess more than ten years in said field and is well known and respected among peers. The petition is to be approved for the duration of the event in which the alien will participate, for a maximum of three years. One-year extensions are permitted thereafter with no maximum cumulative duration.

To prove the alien's extraordinary ability, documentation must be adequate to support extraordinary ability as demonstrated by sustained national or international acclaim; substantial documentation in at least 3 of the acceptable evidence categories defined by statute; a written advisory opinion from a peer group; the employer petition on behalf of the employee; and an offer of employment. For some applicants, a notable association that is an authoritative voice in that specific industry could write a no-objection letter to support that the individual is of extraordinary ability in their field.

Generally, to qualify for O-1A classification, aliens of extraordinary ability in the sciences, education, business, or athletics must demonstrate sustained national or international acclaim and recognition for achievements in the field of expertise by providing evidence of:

Receipt of a major, internationally recognized award, such as the Nobel Prize; or at least three of the following forms of documentation:

 Documentation of the individual's receipt of nationally or internationally recognized prizes or awards for excellence in the field of endeavor;
 Documentation of the individual's membership in associations in the field for which classification is sought, which require outstanding achievements of their members, as judged by recognized national or international experts in their disciplines or fields;
 Published material in professional or major trade publications or major media about the individual, relating to the individual's work in the field for which classification is sought, which shall include the title, date, and author of such published material, and any necessary translation;
 Evidence of the individual's participation on a panel, or individually, as a judge of the work of others in the same or in an allied field of specialization to that for which classification is sought;
 Evidence of the individual's original scientific, scholarly, or business-related contributions of major significance in the field;
 Evidence of the individual's authorship of scholarly articles in the field, in professional journals, or other major media;
 Evidence that the individual has been employed in a critical or essential capacity for organizations and establishments that have a distinguished reputation;
 Evidence that the individual has either commanded a high salary or will command a high salary or other remuneration for services, evidenced by contracts or other reliable evidence.

To qualify for an O-1A visa, an applicant must provide documents proving extraordinary ability. Examples of proof of extraordinary ability include nationally or internationally recognized prizes or awards for excellence, membership in associations requiring outstanding achievements, and articles written by or about the applicant. To supplement these materials, employer may submit letters signed by experts in the applicant's field attesting to the applicant's extraordinary ability in that field.

To qualify for O-1B classification, the applicant will need to supply documents showing that he or she has been nominated for or have received significant national or international awards or prizes in the particular field, such as an Emmy, Grammy, Oscar, or Tony Award. Alternately, the employer filing the petition can submit at least three of the following forms of documentation:

 Has performed services as a lead or starring participant in productions or events with distinguished reputations as shown by critical reviews, ads, publicity releases, publications, contract or endorsements; 
 National or international recognition for achievements through critical reviews, other published materials by or about the beneficiary in major trade papers, trade journals, magazines, and so forth; 
 Has performed in a lead, starring or critical role for organizations and establishments that have a distinguished reputation evidenced by media articles, testimonials, and similar write-ups; 
 Has a record of major commercial or critically acclaimed success; 
 Has achieved significant recognition from organizations, critics, government agencies and recognized experts;
 Has commanded or will command a high salary or other remuneration in comparison to others in the field.

For extraordinary ability in motion picture or television, the definition of "extraordinary" is different. For these individuals, "extraordinary achievement" is defined as "a very high level of accomplishment in the motion picture or television industry evidenced by a degree of skill and recognition substantially above that ordinarily encountered to the extent that the person is recognized as outstanding, leading, or well-known in the motion picture or television field."

Before an O-1 visa can be granted, the applicant must go through a special consultation process. The applicant must get an "advisory opinion" from a peer group, a group of professionals in the alien's occupation or profession, or from a union, labor, or management organization. An "advisory opinion" is a letter from an organization stating that the position the alien applicant will hold requires extraordinary ability.

The peer group must provide a written opinion to the USCIS. If the application does not include a peer group opinion, the USCIS will attempt to contact a peer group directly. If no peer group exists, the USCIS will make a decision without a peer group consultation.

The USCIS will not require a new consultation if the alien beneficiary is reentering the U.S. in the O-1 category within two years of a previous peer group consultation. Unlike the EB1-Extraordinary Ability category, the O-1 category requires employment and sponsorship by the employer.

Consultation with an appropriate peer group, labor and/or management organization regarding the nature of the proposed work and the beneficiary's qualifications is mandatory before an O-1 petition can be approved. This requirement may be especially important in the arts, entertainment fields, or athletics.

An O-1 artist can be sponsored by a U.S. employer, U.S. agent, or a foreign employer through a U.S. agent. Although the artist cannot petition for him/herself for O-1 status, the regulations recognize that O-1 cases can involve workers who are traditionally self-employed.

Statistics

Number of visas issued by year 

In the table below, the years are Fiscal Years, so for instance the year 2009 refers to the period from October 1, 2008 to September 30, 2009. Note that this only counts O visas issued at embassies and consulates outside the United States, and not transitions to O status within the United States via Form I-129. Also, since a single person may need to renew his or her O visa, it is not an estimate of the number of people currently in the status.

References

USCIS: O-1 Visa: Individuals with Extraordinary Ability or Achievement.

External links
 Current information for Artists from Abroad.

United States visas by type